The Dallas County Courthouse is located at the corner of Third and Oak Streets in Fordyce, Arkansas, the county seat of Dallas County.  The two-story Classical Revival building was designed by Frank W. Gibb and built in 1911, three years after the county seat was moved to Fordyce from Princeton.  It is the most substantial Classical Revival building in the county, and a representative early work of the architect.

The building was listed on the National Register of Historic Places in 1984.

See also
National Register of Historic Places listings in Dallas County, Arkansas

References

Courthouses on the National Register of Historic Places in Arkansas
Neoclassical architecture in Arkansas
Government buildings completed in 1911
Buildings and structures in Fordyce, Arkansas
County courthouses in Arkansas
1911 establishments in Arkansas
National Register of Historic Places in Dallas County, Arkansas